The inaugural 1978–79 UAB Blazers men's basketball team represented the University of Alabama at Birmingham (UAB) in the 1978–79 NCAA Division I men's basketball season. Led by head coach Gene Bartow, the Blazers competed as an independent and played their home games at the BJCC Arena. They finished the season 15–11.

Roster

Schedule and results
After losing to Nebraska 64–55 in their inaugural game, UAB completed the 1978–79 season with an overall record of 15–11 during their lone season competing as an independent.

References

UAB Blazers men's basketball seasons
Uab
UAB Blazers
UAB Blazers